Ber  is a village and commune of the Cercle of Timbuktu in the Tombouctou Region of Mali. The village lies 8 km north of the Niger River and 53 km east of Timbuktu. In the 2009 census the commune had a population of 9,128. The commune is mainly sand dunes and extends for 35,280 km2.

References

External links

Communes of Tombouctou Region